Żurek is a Polish family name. The name is spelled the same as the diminutive of żur, cold rye soup. As in the film :pl:Żurek (film) 2003.

 Bartosz Żurek (born 1993), Polish footballer
 Jan Żurek (born 1956), Polish football manager
 Karol Żurek (born 1949), Polish ice hockey player
 Krystyna Ambros-Żurek (born 1961), Polish rower
 Michał Żurek (born 1988), Polish volleyball player
 Wojciech H. Żurek (born 1951), Polish physicist

In the Polish-language wikipedia
 :pl:Lesław Żurek (born 1979) Polish author
 Stanisław Żurek (1926-1996), Polish artist
 Stanisław Żurek, Polish pilot

See also
 
The Czech variant of the name is Žůrek
 Libor Žůrek - Czech footballer

Polish-language surnames